Henkelotherium is an extinct genus of dryolestidan mammal from the Late Jurassic (Kimmeridgian) Camadas de Guimarota, in Portugal. Unlike many other Jurassic mammals, it is known from a largely complete skeleton, and is thought to have had an arboreal lifestyle.

Description 

Paleobiology 
Primitive characters of Henkelotherium (e.g. asymmetric condyles of the femur) indicate that this species had a mode of locomotion similar to tree shrews and opossums. The small size of Henkelotherium and elongated tail made it suited to an arboreal lifestyle and capable of climbing trees, a notion supported by the paleoecological reconstruction of the Guimarota ecosystem indicating a densely vegetated environment.

Taxonomy 
In cladistic analyses, Henkelotherium has been considered closely related to Dryolestidae, either as a part of that group, or as closely related but placed outside that family as a non-dryolestid dryolestidan.

See also

 Prehistoric mammal
 List of prehistoric mammals

References

Further reading 
 Ramón Vázquez Molinero: Comparative anatomy of Henkelotherium guimarotae (Holotheria), a late Jurassic small mammal, and its relevance for the evolution of the mode of locomotion of modern mammals. Dissertation. Freie Universität Berlin, Fachbereich Geowissenschaften, 2003. Dissertation Online
http://www.diss.fu-berlin.de/diss/receive/FUDISS_thesis_000000001206

Dryolestida
Late Jurassic mammals of Europe
Jurassic Portugal
Fossils of Portugal
Fossil taxa described in 1991
Prehistoric mammal genera